Herman Van Duyzen (born 1902, date of death unknown) was a Belgian wrestler. He competed in the freestyle lightweight event at the 1924 Summer Olympics.

References

External links

1902 births
Year of death missing
Olympic wrestlers of Belgium
Wrestlers at the 1924 Summer Olympics
Belgian male sport wrestlers
Place of birth missing